Paul Pearson (born June 15, 1957, in Campbell River, British Columbia) is a former slotback who played ten seasons in the Canadian Football League, mainly for the Toronto Argonauts. His two clutch receptions on the game-winning drive played a key part in the Argos' 1983 Grey Cup victory.

External links
 https://web.archive.org/web/20050129052409/http://www.argonauts.ca/Argos/History/ArgoHeroes/2004/09/24/642226.html

1957 births
Calgary Stampeders players
Canadian football slotbacks
Players of Canadian football from British Columbia
Living people
People from Campbell River, British Columbia
Saskatchewan Roughriders players
Toronto Argonauts players
University of British Columbia alumni
UBC Thunderbirds football players